Inkosi Langalibalele Local Municipality is a local municipality of South Africa. It was established after the 2016 South African municipal elections by the merging of Imbabazane and uMtshezi local municipalities.

Politics 

The municipal council consists of forty-seven members elected by mixed-member proportional representation. Twenty-four councillors were elected by first-past-the-post voting in twenty-four wards, while the remaining twenty-three were chosen from party lists so that the total number of party representatives was proportional to the number of votes received. 

In the election of 1 November 2021 the Inkatha Freedom Party (IFP) obtained a plurality of twenty-one seats.
 
The following table shows the results of the election.

References

Local municipalities of the Uthukela District Municipality